Huang Fengtao (born June 17, 1985) is a Chinese football player who currently plays as a striker for Shenzhen Ledman.

Club career
Huang Fengtao started his professional football career at Shenzhen Jianlibao at the beginning of the 2003 league season after graduating from their youth team. He would go on to make his debut against Bayi Football Team on April 17, 2003, in a 5–1 victory, which was followed several months later with his debut goal against Yunnan Hongta F.C. on October 12, 2003, in a league game that ended in a 1–0 victory. Despite making an impression in his debut season he would miss the majority of the 2004 league season when Shenzhen won the league Chinese Super League title when he dropped in favour of the experienced former international Yang Chen and the emerging Zheng Zhi. He was allowed to reaffirm his position in the Shenzhen team when he played in a further 13 games with two goals in the 2005 league season. Since then he would continue to progress his position at Shenzhen by establishing himself the next season by playing in a further 22 games and confirming his position as Shenzhens first choice striker.
In February 2014, Huang transferred to China League One side Shijiazhuang Yongchan .
On 25 February 2016, Huang transferred to fellow China League One side Wuhan Zall.

On 10 January 2017, Huang moved to League Two side Shenzhen Ledman.

Club career statistics
Statistics accurate as of match played 13 October 2018.

References

External links

1985 births
Living people
People from Haifeng County
Chinese footballers
Footballers from Shanwei
Shenzhen F.C. players
Zhejiang Professional F.C. players
Cangzhou Mighty Lions F.C. players
Wuhan F.C. players
Chinese Super League players
China League One players
Association football forwards